Mundet may refer to:

 Agustí Garriga i Mundet, mayor of the Spanish and Catalan city of Girona in 1891
 Artur Mundet i Carbó, a Catalan-Mexican entrepreneur and philanthropist
 CV AA Llars Mundet, a volleyball team in the Spanish and Catalan city of Barcelona
 Jeroni Granell i Mundet, a Catalan architect and road planner
 Mundet metro station, in the Spanish and Catalan city of Barcelona
 Parque Arturo Mundet, a park in Mexico City
 Prisco Mundet, a form of cream soda from Mexico
 Recinte Mundet, an area of the Spanish and Catalan city of Barcelona that now houses a campus of the University of Barcelona
 Sidral Mundet, an apple-flavored carbonated soft drink from Mexico